ULAS J003402.77-005206.7 (also ULAS J0034-00) is a Y-type brown dwarf in the constellation of Cetus.

ULAS J0034-00 is one of the coolest brown dwarfs known.  It was first identified in data from the UK Infrared Telescope (UKIRT) Infrared
Deep Sky Survey (UKIDSS).  Infrared spectra subsequently taken with the IRS instrument on the Spitzer Space Telescope give an estimated effective temperature of between 550 and 600 K and does not emit any visible light.  Its mass is estimated at between 5 and 20 Jupiter masses and its age at between 0.1 and 2.0 billion years.

References

Cetus (constellation)
Y-type stars